Marcus Sandell (born 23 September 1987 in Espoo) is a Finnish alpine skier. He represented Finland at the 2010 Winter Olympics in Vancouver. He suffered serious injury on 28 September 2009 on the training session in nearby Pitztaler glacier, Austria. Due to the crash, his kidney had to be removed at the hospital in Innsbruck. After 5 months his accident, Sandell competed at the 2010 Winter Olympics, and finished at the 19th place in Giant slalom first run. In the second run he is out, and didn't finished the competition.

World Cup results

Season standings

Results per discipline

 standings through 20 Jan 2019

World Championship results

Olympic results

References

External links

1987 births
Living people
Sportspeople from Espoo
Finnish male alpine skiers
Olympic alpine skiers of Finland
Alpine skiers at the 2010 Winter Olympics
Alpine skiers at the 2014 Winter Olympics
21st-century Finnish people